Roman Pichler (born 5 March 1941) is an Austrian former footballer. He played in 13 matches for the Austria national football team from 1960 to 1967.

References

External links
 

1941 births
Living people
Austrian footballers
Austria international footballers
Place of birth missing (living people)
Association footballers not categorized by position